Fluterschen is a municipality in the district of Altenkirchen, in Rhineland-Palatinate, Germany.

Early in 2011, the discovery of a child abuse case going on for years brought Fluterschen
nationwide headlines across Germany, and to a lesser extent, internationally.

References

Altenkirchen (district)